Ludovico Héctor Avio (6 October 1932 – 23 June 1996) was an Argentine football forward who played for Argentina in the 1958 FIFA World Cup. He also played for Club Atlético Vélez Sársfield.

References

External links
FIFA profile
Brief biography of Ludovico Avio 

1932 births
1996 deaths
Argentine footballers
Argentina international footballers
Association football forwards
Club Atlético Vélez Sarsfield footballers
1958 FIFA World Cup players